The following is a list of former districts of the Massachusetts Senate in the United States. The legislative districts were created to apportion elected representation in the Massachusetts Senate based on voter population. In recent decades, redistricting occurs every ten years.

Former state senate districts

 1st Bristol district
 1st Hampden district
 1st Norfolk district
 1st Plymouth district
 1st Suffolk and Norfolk district
 1st Worcester and Middlesex district
 2nd Bristol district
 2nd Hampden district
 2nd Hampden and Hampshire district
 2nd Norfolk district
 2nd Plymouth district
 2nd Suffolk and Norfolk district
 2nd Worcester and Middlesex district
 3rd Bristol district
 3rd Essex and Middlesex district
 3rd Middlesex and Norfolk district
 3rd Norfolk district
 3rd Suffolk district
 3rd Worcester district
 4th Essex district
 4th Suffolk district
 4th Worcester district
 5th Essex district
 5th Suffolk district
 5th Worcester district
 6th Essex district
 6th Middlesex district
 6th Suffolk district
 7th Middlesex district
 7th Suffolk district
 8th Middlesex district
 8th Suffolk district
 9th Suffolk district
 Barnstable County
 Berkshire district
 Berkshire and Hampshire district
 Berkshire, Franklin, Hampden and Hampshire district
 Berkshire, Hampden, Hampshire, and Franklin district
 Berkshire, Hampshire and Franklin district
 Berkshire, Hampshire and Hampden district
 Bristol and Plymouth district
 Cape district
 Cape and Plymouth district
 Central Worcester district
 East Hampden district
 East Norfolk district
 East Worcester district
 Essex County
 Franklin district
 Franklin and Hampshire district
 Hampden and Berkshire district
 Hampden and Hampshire district
 Hampshire district
 Hampshire and Franklin district
 Island district
 Middle Plymouth district
 Middlesex and Essex district
 Middlesex and Norfolk district
 Middlesex County
 Middlesex, Norfolk and Worcester district
 Middlesex, Suffolk and Essex district
 Norfolk district
 Norfolk and Bristol district
 Norfolk and Middlesex district
 Norfolk County
 North Berkshire district
 North Bristol district
 North Norfolk district
 North Plymouth district
 North-East Worcester district
 Plymouth district
 Plymouth County
 South Berkshire district
 South Bristol district
 South Plymouth district
 South-East Worcester district
 South-West Worcester district
 Suffolk and Middlesex district
 Suffolk and Norfolk district
 Suffolk County
 Suffolk, Essex and Middlesex district
 West Bristol district
 West Hampden district
 West Norfolk district
 West Worcester district
 Worcester district
 Worcester and Hampden district
 Worcester and Hampshire district
 Worcester County
 Worcester, Franklin, Hampden and Hampshire district
 Worcester, Hampden and Hampshire district
 Worcester, Hampden, Hampshire and Franklin district

See also
 List of current districts of the Massachusetts Senate
 History of the Massachusetts General Court
 List of Massachusetts General Courts
 List of former districts of the Massachusetts House of Representatives
 Apportionment in US state legislatures

References

Further reading

External links

 
  (Lampi Collection)

 
Massachusetts-related lists